Žinyčia (literally: temple of pagan Lithuanians or treasury of knowledge) was the first Lithuanian-language cultural magazine targeting Lithuania proper. Established in 1900 by priest Juozas Tumas-Vaižgantas, it targeted members of the Catholic intelligentsia. Due to the Lithuanian press ban, it had to be printed in Tilsit, East Prussia (present-day Sovetsk, Kaliningrad Oblast) and smuggled into Lithuania. The circulation was 500 copies.

History
Lithuanian clergy began publishing Catholic-minded newspaper Tėvynės sargas in January 1896. From December 1897 to May 1902, it was edited by Juozas Tumas-Vaižgantas. Tėvynės sargas was geared towards the uneducated villagers and Tumas yearned for a magazine for the intelligentsia. He understood that the magazine would not be able to support itself financially and solicited donations. The plan was to publish four issues a year, but due to financial difficulties the issues were irregular. Two issues (155 and 96 pages) were published in 1900, one issue (99 pages) in 1901, and one double issue (127 pages) in 1902. For government purposes, the magazine needed to identify an editor who was a resident of East Prussia. Such official editor of Žinyčia was Prussian Lithuanian Jurgis Lapinas. 

Tumas, reassigned from Kuliai to  near Kuršėnai in July 1901 and to  near Naujamiestis in May 1902, could no longer edit either Tėvynės sargas or Žinyčia. In 1903, priest Antanas Milukas merged Žinyčia with Dirva, published in Shenandoah, Pennsylvania, since 1898. The combined quarterly magazine was known as Dirva-Žinynas. Eight issues appeared before the joint publication was discontinued in 1904. The stand-alone Dirva continued to be published until 1906.

Content
Žinyčia was a cultural, not political magazine. In his opening letter, Tumas invited intellectuals of all political views to contribute. Tumas published translated works of bishop Motiejus Valančius and an article for the 100th anniversary of his birth. He also published a resume of a work by Princeton professor John Grier Hibben on self-identity (ego). The magazine devoted substantial attention to the issues of Lithuanian language, including grammar and spelling. Other articles analyzed the history of Lithuania, including an article by Jonas Basanavičius in which he presented his hypothesis that Lithuanians were descendants of Thracians and Phrygians. (pen name Savasis) published a review of Basanavičius' and Jonas Žilius' theories of Lithuanians' origins (issue 4–5, pages 1–8). Adomas Jakštas contributed several articles, including on Latin books published in the former Grand Duchy of Lithuania and on Bible translations into Lithuanian. Kazimieras Macius (pen name Samogita) published a lengthy study on the Lithuanian folk songs, Pranciškus Būčys (signed P.B.) wrote a short article on what civilization is, Jurgis Šaulys (pen name Mažagetas) raised the issue of the national anthem and proposed Kur bėga Šešupė, kur Nemunas teka by Maironis (issue 4–5, pages 51–52).

References

Magazines established in 1900
Magazines disestablished in 1902
1900 establishments in Germany
1902 disestablishments in Germany
Lithuanian press ban
Lithuanian-language magazines
Catholic magazines
Cultural magazines
Defunct magazines published in Germany